Jordy is a masculine given name, and sometimes a diminutive of the name Jordan. Notable people and characters with the name include:

People 
 Jordy (singer) (Jordy Lemoine, born 1988), French singer and musician
 Jordy Birch, Canadian singer-songwriter and music producer
 Jordy ter Borgh (born 1994), Dutch footballer
 Jordy Brouwer (born 1988), Dutch footballer
 Jordy Buijs (born 1988), Dutch footballer
 Jordy Clasie (born 1991), Dutch footballer
 Jordy Croux (born 1994), Belgian footballer
 Jordy van Deelen (born 1993), Dutch footballer
 Jordy Delem (born 1993), footballer from Martinique
 Jordy Deckers (born 1989), Dutch footballer
 Jordy Douglas (born 1958), Canadian ice hockey player
 Jordy Gaspar (born 1997), French footballer
 Jordy Hiwula (born 1994), English footballer
 Jordy Lokando (born 1997), Belgian footballer
 Jordy van Loon (born 1993), Dutch singer
 Jordy Mercer (born 1986), American Major League Baseball player
 Jordy Mont-Reynaud (born 1983), American chess master
 Jordy Nelson (born 1985), American National Football League player
 Jordy Reid (born 1991), Australian rugby union footballer
 Jordy Smith (born 1988), South African surfer
 Jordy Thomassen (born 1993), Dutch footballer
 Jordy Vleugels (born 1996), Belgian footballer
 Jordy Walker (1930–2010), sailor from Bermuda in the 1972 Olympics
 Jordy de Wijs (born 1995), Dutch footballer
 Jordy van der Winden (born 1994), Dutch footballer
 Jordy Zuidam (born 1980), Dutch footballer

Fictional characters 
 Jordy Verrill, in the short story "Weeds" by Stephen King

See also
 Jordi
 Jordie
 Geordie (disambiguation)
 Geordi La Forge, a character in the television series Star Trek: The Next Generation

English-language masculine given names
English masculine given names
Masculine given names